The Journal of Mining Science is a bimonthly, peer reviewed scientific journal published by Springer Science+Business Media that covers all aspects of mining engineering. Topics include geomechanics, information geoscience, the properties and behaviors of rock in various environments and conditions, and various technologies applied to mining. The editor-in-chief is Victor N. Oparin. 

Also, this journal is the English translation of Fiziko-Tekhnicheskie Problemy Razrabotki Poleznykh Iskopaemykh, a Russian journal first published in 1967. However, the English translation, the Journal of Mining Science, was first published in September 1992.

Abstracting and indexing
This journal is indexed by the following services:

Science Citation Index Expanded 
Journal Citation Reports
SCOPUS 
CSA Illumina
Academic OneFile 
Academic Search 
AGRICOLA 
Coal Abstracts
Current Abstracts 
Current Contents/Engineering, Computing and Technology, 
Earthquake Engineering Abstracts 
Engineering Index-Compendex
Engineering index annual
Engineering index energy abstracts 
Engineering index monthly
Engineered Materials Abstracts 
Energy Research Abstracts
GeoRef 
Materials Science Citation Index
MINPROC
Mining Technology Abstracts (MINTEC) 
Summon by Serial Solutions
According to the Journal Citation Reports, the journal has a 2016 impact factor of 0.353.

References

Springer Science+Business Media academic journals
Publications established in 1967
Biannual journals
English-language journals
Mining journals